Ratho is a village in the Rural West Edinburgh area of Edinburgh, Scotland. Its population at the 2011 census was 1,634 based on the 2010 definition of the locality. It was formerly in the old county of Midlothian. Ratho Station, Newbridge and Kirkliston are other villages in the area. The Union Canal passes through Ratho. Edinburgh Airport is situated only 4 miles (7 km) away. The village has a high ratio of its older houses built from whin stone due to a whin quarry nearby. The older, historical, part of the village was designated a Conservation Area in 1971 by Midlothian County Council.

Origins

Ratho appears in written records from 1243 with various spellings such as Rath (ewe, eu, ew, ow, au) but most consistently, from 1292, with its present name Ratho. Other places nearby having "Ratho" in their names include Ratho Byres, Ratho Park and Ratho Bank (now named Ashley).

It is believed that the name Ratho comes from Rath, Scottish Gaelic, for a place where there are hill forts. Both Kaimes and Dalmahoy hill forts are nearby.

To the southwest of the village, Tormain Hill is the site of Stone Age symbols carved into the rocks atop the hill and a 'witches' stone'. When the witches' stone was moved by the land owner for farming, it was believed evil spirits were released into the village.

Haltoun House
There are a number of old buildings in the area. The most prominent of these was Haltoun House or castle (pronounced, and sometimes spelt, Hatton), which was badly damaged by fire in the mid-1950s and subsequently taken down. This magnificent country house evolved from its central core, a Norman keep, or what Scots call a Pele Tower. In 1371 the manor and lands of Haltoun were resigned to the Crown by John de Haltoun, and were regranted to Alan de Lawedre [Lauder] of that Ilk who then resided mostly at Whitslaid Tower just outside Lauder. Haltoun Tower was damaged during the House of Douglas troubles of 1452, when a note in the Treasurers' Accounts show funds being provided for its repair. The Haltoun estates remained in the Lauder family until the latter half of the 17th century when they passed by marriage to Charles Maitland, 3rd Earl of Lauderdale, who enlarged and beautified Hatton House.

Parish Church (St Marys)

There is evidence of a pre-Norman, Celtic church on this site, and reference to St Mary's in Ratho date back to 1243. Up until the Reformation, Ratho was part of the Bishopric of St Andrews but had been annexed to Corstorphine Church to the east.

The east aisle is dated 1683. West of the south aisle (1830) half of an ornate 12th century doorway is still visible. Generally the church has never been grand, but it bears the hallmarks of centuries of evolutionary change. The interior was generally denuded in 1932 including loss of the 18th century gallery. A 13th century memorial lies in the south porch. One curious feature is the bell, which was rung by an external chain which has carved a groove into the stonework below the bell.

The churchyard is of equal antiquity and interest. Its greatest oddity is a gravestone to John Mitchell who died in 1749 aged 80 years. He was a mason by trade and the gravestone was cut out many years before he died in the form of a panelled coffin. An identical coffin stone (dated 1751) exists in Currie churchyard 5 miles to the south-east. Richard Lauder, the last Lauder laird of Haltoun, was interred in the graveyard on 29 November 1675. Other graves of note are Thomas Wilkie (d.1679), William Anderson (d.1756) and the Rev Andrew Duncan (d.1827) (Moderator of the Church of Scotland in 1824).

The manse is a very fine two storey Georgian villa standing to the east on the opposite side of the main road. It dates from around 1790 and is constructed of whin stone. It faces southwards, away from the road. Its outbuildings have been converted into a separate house now slightly separating it from the church.

A new cemetery of far less character now lies on the NE outskirts of the village, slightly out of sight from the churchyard, just east of the manse.

Notable Ministers
William Wilkie  from 1753 to 1759, Professor of Natural Philosophy at St Andrews University and known as "Potato Willie" for his poetry
Very Rev Andrew Duncan Moderator of the General Assembly of the Church of Scotland in 1824

Transport

Ratho is located close to both the M8 and the M9 motorways. The A8 and A71 run parallel to the north and the south of the village. These are two of the major roads running into Edinburgh.
There is a network of paths around Ratho and the surrounding area, and you can also walk or cycle along the canal towpath.

McGill's Scotland East
20: Ratho - Ratho Station - Ingliston Park & Ride - Gyle Centre - Edinburgh Park - Hermiston Gait - Westside Plaza - Chesser (operates Ratho to Hermiston Gait only on evenings and Sundays)

E&M Horsburgh
40
St John's Hospital - Livingston - Mid Calder - East Calder - Ratho - Gogar - City Bypass - Gilmerton  - Royal Infirmary
(runs 4 times a day in both directions)

Union Canal

The Union Canal was built through the area from 1818 to 1822.

Ratho is the location of Edinburgh Canal Centre, founded in 1989 by Ronnie Rusack. The Seagull Trust is a boating charity offering free cruises to disabled people since 1979. It also boasts the only dry dock on the Union Canal. On either side of Bridge 15 are a series of artworks relating to the canal's history. Many of these can be used as seating.

"Baird Road" commemorates Hugh Baird who designed the canal.

The Union Canal no longer operates as a transport link, but is now used for fishing, magnet fishing and some leisure boating. It has a towpath previously used by the horses which drew canal barges and which is now used as a footpath, the foot paths are popular places for dog walkers, bikers, runners and walkers.

Notable attractions

Edinburgh International Climbing Arena

The arena was the world's biggest indoor climbing arena when it was opened in December 2003.

Lin’s Mill
West of Ratho stands a small group of mill buildings dating from around 1600. A group of rubble-built cottages sited at right angles to the mill were demolished in the 1960s reducing the size of the group.

Conversion to a house in 1971 by Morris and Steadman greatly reduced its historic significance and it is listed category C.

In the wood above Lin's Mill is the grave of William Lin reputed to be the last man in Scotland to die of the plague (but many similar plague graves exist from that year).  The grave is marked by a slab with a crude coat of arms, memento mori and the inscription "Here lyeth the dust of William Lin right heritor of Linsmiln who died in the year of the lord 1645".

The nearby Almond Aqueduct on the Union Canal is also known as the Lin's Mill Aqueduct.

Wavegarden Scotland
In October 2019, construction started in Craigpark Quarry in Ratho of the first inland surfing lagoon in Scotland. Wavegarden Scotland is scheduled to open in 2024. The facility is designed to occupy an area of 48,500 square metres, and will have a user capacity of up to 100 surfers per hour. The amenities will include a surf school, surf shop, and cafe/restaurant as well as accommodation of mixed sizes including bothies, pods and lodges.

Notable residents

 James Anderson of Hermiston
 Walter Leonard Bell 
 Very Rev Andrew Duncan, Moderator of the General Assembly of the Church of Scotland 1824
 Sir John Gibson
 Thomas Grainger
 Alexander Lauder
 Alexander Lauder of Blyth
 John Maitland, 5th Earl of Lauderdale
 James Maitland, 8th Earl of Lauderdale
 William Serle
 William Grant Stevenson, sculptor
 David Watson Stevenson, sculptor
 Ebenezer James MacRae, architect
 Richard Turner (geologist)
 William Wilkie, poet

References

External links

 Seagull Trust, boating charity offering free boating for disabled people
 The Edinburgh International Climbing Arena: Ratho
 Ratho on Google Maps - The M8 is visible to the north and the Union Canal runs west to east. The Climbing Arena is clearly visible between the two, and Ratho itself is to the east.

Villages in Edinburgh council area
Parishes formerly in Midlothian